Olenellina is a suborder of the order Redlichiida of trilobites that occurs about halfway during the Lower Cambrian, at the start of the stage called the Atdabanian. The earliest trilobites in the fossil record are arguably Olenellina, although the earliest Redlichiina and Eodiscina follow quickly. The suborder died out when the Lower passed into the Middle Cambrian, at the end of the stage called Toyonian. A feature uniting the Olenellina is the lack of rupture lines (or sutures) in the headshield, which in other trilobites assist the periodic moulting (or ecdysis), associated with arthropod growth. Some derived trilobites have lost facial sutures again (some Eodiscina, all Agnostina, and a few Phacopina), but all of these are blind, while all Olenellina have eyes.

Taxonomy 
The suborder contains four superfamilies: Olenelloidea (with 3 families and 5 stemgroup genera), Judomioidea (with 1 family and 3 stemgroup genera), Nevadioidea, and Fallotaspidoidea (with 3 families and 3 stemgroup genera). Lieberman, 2002, considered that the Fallotaspidoidea are a paraphyletic group because it gave rise to the Redlichiina; he did not propose to restrict the Olenellina to the Olenelloidea, Judomioidea and Nevadioidea. Neither did he propose to assign this group of superfamilies to a newly formed order Olenellida, and consequently expand the Redlichiina to include the Fallotaspidoidea. This would imply that the Redlichiina would include taxa with and without dorsal sutures.

Distribution 
The Olenellina appear suddenly at the start of the Cambrian Series 2 (between Stage 2 Tommotian and Stage 3 Atdabanian) approximately  million years ago, and disappear at the end of this Series (between Stage 4 Toyonian and Stage 5 Amgan),  to  million years ago. The Olenellina probably first occurred on the paleocontinent Siberia and spread into the part of Gondwana that is now the Atlas Mountains, Baltica, Avalonia and Laurentia. In western Laurentia the first representatives to appear are Fallotaspididae, followed by Archaeaspididae, Nevadioidea and Holmiidae, and finally Biceratopsidae and Olenellidae. The Olenellina are not known from South China, Australia and most of Latin America and Africa, where the first trilobites were Redlichiina, that had already developed dorsal sutures.

Description 
As with most early trilobites, the Olenellina have an almost flat exoskeleton, that is only thinly calcified, and have crescent-shaped eye ridges. The suborder differs from all other trilobites by the lack of dorsal sutures in the head shield (or cephalon). There is a ventral mouth plate (or conterminant hypostome) with a very wide rostral plate extending between genal angles, with a perrostral suture (no connective sutures).

The thorax may be composed of a prothorax that generally has 14 or 15 segments, and an opisthothorax that has between 0 and up to 34 segments. In segment 3, the areas right and left of the axis (or pleural lobes) are often enlarged, sometimes carrying large trailing pleural spines. Segment 14 or 15 is often bearing a large spine at midline that points backwards.

The pygidium is mostly very small with few segments, that are often difficult to discern.

Unlike in other trilobite groups, the early larval stage called protaspid is not known, and it is generally accepted that this is because the protaspid was not calcified.

Key to the superfamilies

References 

 
Redlichiida
Cambrian trilobites
Cambrian trilobites of Asia
Cambrian trilobites of Europe
Cambrian trilobites of North America
Cambrian animals of Africa
Cambrian Series 2 first appearances
Cambrian Series 2 extinctions
Arthropod suborders